The Royal Jordanian Navy is naval warfare branch of the Armed Forces of the Kingdom of Jordan. As Jordan is landlocked except at its southern extremity, with only  of shoreline along the Gulf of Aqaba providing access to the Red Sea, its Naval Force comprises 27 patrol boats, and has a total complement of more than 700 personnel, excluding the 77th Marines Reconnaissance Battalion. The Naval Force is under the command of the army.

As of July 2016 the Commander of the Navy is Brigadier General Ibrahim Salman Al-Naimat.

The Royal Jordanian Navy also cooperates with other nations in the region, being part of the maritime Combined Task Force 152 that provides security in the Persian Gulf.

History
The Royal Naval Force was established in 1951 as the Royal Coast Guard. It was established in Aqaba. Its size was about that of an infantry company i.e.,circa 200 men. In 1952, the Coast Guard Headquarters was moved to the Dead Sea area and remained there until 1967. In 1974, The Coast Guard was provided with four medium patrol boats (Bertram Class) and with equipment for the divers and frogmen.

The naval element of the armed forces, although designated the Royal Jordanian Navy, remained an integral part of the army. Performing essentially a coast guard mission, in 1988 it had 300 officers and men based at Al Aqabah, the country's only port, with access to the Red Sea. The navy operated five coastal patrol boats of United States manufacture armed with light machine guns. The navy assisted in the maintenance of harbor security, operating in conjunction with customs and immigration personnel to ensure the enforcement of the country's laws and regulations. In late 1987, three larger craft of ninety-five tons each were ordered from Britain. When introduced, each would have a crew of sixteen and would be armed with 20mm and 30mm guns. Israeli units at the adjacent Israeli naval facility at Elat similarly consisted of small, lightly armed patrol boats.

In 1991, the Coast Guard was provided with three heavy patrol boats (Hawk Class). On 13 November 1991 the Royal Coast Guard was renamed as the Royal Naval Force.

As part of the IDEX 2009 exhibition, Dr. Moayad Samman, Chairman and CEO of the King Abdullah II Design and Development Bureau (Kaddb), will be signing a joint venture agreement with Mr. Mark T. Hornsby Managing Director of RiverHawk Worldwide LLC to establish Jordan RiverHawk Shipbuilding and Support, PSC. Kaddb and RiverHawk Worldwide LLC agreed on establishing Jordan RiverHawk Shipbuilding and Support to manufacture, market and supply AMP-137 Advanced Multi-mission Platform Vessels, Provide training and service and maintenance on each vessel sold, Explore the development of other vessels for customers in the region as well a provide maintenance services for other vessels. The partnership with Kaddb will allow RiverHawk Worldwide to exchange the know-how with the Bureau and to benefit from the skilled workforce to manufacture top-of-the-line vessels to be marketed to the Jordan Armed Forces as the number one customer to Kaddb and then to the region.

Royal Naval Units 

 Naval Command HQ
 Command Staff
 Naval Signal Company
 Combat Vessels Group
 Naval Frogmen Group
 77th Marine Battalion
 Naval Special Boat Unit
 Counter-terrorism Team from Special Unit-II
 Marine Surveillance Company / Aqaba
 Marine Surveillance Company / Dead Sea
 Technical Support Group
 Maritime Training Center

Equipment

Patrol boats

Special maritime forces boats

Naval infrastructure
 Naval base: Aqaba

References

1956 establishments in Jordan
Naval Force
Jordanian Armed Forces
Military units and formations established in 1956